Kenneth Charles Turner (August 17, 1943 – December 22, 2016) was a pitcher in Major League Baseball who played in 13 games for the California Angels during the 1967 season.

External links

Retrosheet

1943 births
2016 deaths
Arizona Instructional League Angels players
Baseball players from Massachusetts
California Angels players
El Paso Sun Kings players
Hawaii Islanders players
Industriales de Valencia players
Major League Baseball pitchers
Sportspeople from Framingham, Massachusetts
Quad Cities Angels players
San Jose Bees players
Seattle Angels players
Tri-City Angels players